North Korea's political penal labor colonies, transliterated kwalliso or kwan-ri-so, constitute one of three forms of political imprisonment in the country, the other two being what David Hawk translated as "short-term detention/forced-labor centers" and "long-term prison labor camps", for misdemeanor and felony offenses respectively. In total, there are an estimated 80,000 to 120,000 political prisoners.

Durations of imprisonment are variable, however, many are condemned to labor for life. Forced labor duties within kwalliso typically include forced labor in mines (known examples including coal, gold, and iron ore), tree felling, timber cutting, or agricultural duties. Furthermore, camps contain state run prison farms, furniture manufacturing, etc.

Estimates suggest that at the start of 2007, a total of six kwalliso camps were operating within the country. Despite fourteen kwalliso camps originally operating within North Korea, these later merged or were closed following the reallocation of prisoners. Kwalliso gained yet more international attention when Otto Warmbier, an American college student, was jailed in a kwalliso and died very shortly after release.

Origins and development 

Second only to its developing nuclear program, the violation of human rights that occurs in North Korea dominates the negative international perception of the nation. Tracing the development of these prisons, the ultimate symbol of North Korean state oppression, in a way traces the trajectory of the nation itself. Furthermore, the advent and development of the prisons can be directly linked to the severing of ties with the rest of the world and to the radicalization of the state.

Historical emergence and conceptualization 
In January 1979, a report was released by Amnesty International detailing the harrowing story of Ali Lameda, a Venezuelan poet imprisoned in North Korea. He had been arrested in 1967, held for a year without trial, placed on house arrest, then incarcerated again for six years, a portion of his twenty-year sentence. It was the first-ever report on human rights in North Korea. Yet this international awareness did not indicate something new, for long before this report was compiled, individuals had been systematically imprisoned for political crimes in North Korea for decades.

Even though incarceration of political prisoners is not a uniquely North Korean or Stalinist practice, the system of prisons in North Korea developed under the half-century rule of Kim Il-sung (1945–94) and currently overseen by his grandson is widely regarded as a distinctive abomination in the modern world , described as “barbaric” , a “modern holocaust” , and occasionally, a “gulag”. Therefore, the contemporary use of the word “gulag” in discussing North Korea's intricate system of prisons is a deliberate reminder of North Korea's former Soviet ties. It suggests that, along with totalitarian ideology, centralized economic planning, and forced collectivization, among other practices, the systemic imprisonment of a country's citizens and purging of political enemies are inherited practices from Stalin's USSR, passed along to North Korea's ruling system.

Stalinist and Maoist influences 
From its inception, North Korea has maintained a complex relationship with Russia and China. Immediately after the end of the Korean War (1953), North Korea and Kim Il-sung looked to the Soviet Union and China for both economic and military support. Prior to the great split between the Soviet Union and China in the early 1960s, Kim visited both Moscow and Beijing often, but the split created enormous problems for Kim, who struggled to keep on good terms with both of them. To a large extent, he owed his career as well as his country's well-being to the Soviet Union and China, yet he was always wary of their dominant power. But the Sino-Soviet dispute also gave Kim Il-sung ample space to maneuver between the two great powers of communism, each of which was forced to tolerate his independence for fear of pushing him decisively to the opposite camp.

While according to North Korean propaganda, Kim is the sole originator of all policy, the original leader was not original in all of his ideas. Even Juche, hailed as the fundamental original Korean ideology, has been attributed to earlier Korean philosophers. In sum, the model for the prison camp system may have come from the gulags established by Joseph Stalin in the 1930s, which ironically might have come into North Korea as a reaction against a wave of de-Stalinization, led by the Soviet Union, in the 1950s. Another possibility is that Kim's departure from Soviet doctrine indicated a shift closer to Maoist China.

Development of the prison camp system 

North Korean history produced an endless wave after wave of persecuted individuals, yet there is no coherent trail showing when the political and penal mechanisms developed to systematically accommodate them. The story of persecuted groups in North Korea begins with the country's origin following Japan's defeat in WWII and the liberation of the Korean peninsula. In the North, Kim Il Sung systematically purged his political opponents, creating a highly centralized system that accorded him unlimited power and generated a formidable cult of personality. North Korea instituted a revolution that included genuinely popular reforms such as establishing an eight-hour work day, promoting literacy, and positing the formal equality of the sexes. However, it also included a purge of Koreans in the police and government bureaucracies who had collaborated with the Japanese colonization of Korea and a sweeping land reform program that expropriated the landholdings of absentee Japanese landlords and the native Korean landed aristocracy. Numerous purged police officials and disposed Korean landlords fled to the south, but their family members who remained in the north remained under suspicion, and many would end up imprisoned in the North Korean prison system. During the Korean War, North Koreans accused of collaboration with the United States, South Korea, and the United Nations Command were also imprisoned.

While Kim attempted to fuse returning Korean exiles (mostly members of the Chinese, Japanese, or Soviet Russian communist parties) into the Korean Workers Party, his plans for northern Korea were challenged by other Korean political parties affiliated with two religions: Protestant Christianity and an indigenous syncretic faith known as “Eastern Learning” (Donghak), later called “Church of the Heavenly Way” (Cheondogyo). These religious-based social movements had led the internal opposition to Japanese colonial rule in Korea and were very well organized in the northern areas of the Korean peninsula. One of these leaders was actually a first choice by the Soviets (over Kim Il Sung) to lead the newly minted North Korean state in 1945, but he turned down the invitation. Suppressing these non-communist parties led to numerous arrests and executions. And again, family members who remained in the north remained under suspicion.

Another round of purges occurred during the fallout after the attempt to overthrow Kim Il Sung in 1956. Here, the practice of “self-criticism” was introduced. People at all levels of the party, including Politburo members and government ministers, were forced to undergo these purposefully humiliating displays of dedication to the Party. These were uniquely cruel, as some victims were ousted from their jobs while a smaller number of individuals even lost their lives. This 1950s wave of persecution finally left the only faction Kim Il Sung desired: his loyal band of Manchuria-based, communist, anti-Japanese partisans who became the enduring foundation of the present North Korean regime. Yet, there are no references in the documentation to a collectivization process or a systemic means of imprisoning accused “traitors” in dedicated camps.

Today, the internment camps for people accused of political offenses or denounced as politically unreliable are reportedly run by the State Security Department. Yet in practice, the distribution of roles between the respective security agencies has apparently varied over time and between provinces, influenced by political priorities, available capacity, the relative power of senior officials, and the extent to which a particular agency enjoyed the trust of the supreme leader. In many cases, the three main security agencies—State Security Department, Ministry of People's Security, and Military Security Command—competed to show their efficiency in identifying ideological opponents to gain favor with the leader. In relation to incidents or issues seen as major political threats, the leader or central-level decision-making organs required security agencies to coordinate their investigations. There are reports, for example, that semi-permanent structures were set up by secret order of Kim Jong-il and maintained under Kim Jong-un.

Such a huge prison camp system – operating in secret and completely outside the law and the reach of the law, such as is the case in North Korea – risks becoming a dumping ground for all sorts of persons. It is widely suspected that the North Korean camps, then, became the sites for un-repatriated South Korean prisoners of war from the Korean War, or for other South Korean and Japanese citizens who have been abducted by North Korean security and police operatives over the course of the last thirty to forty years of the 20th century, and into the 21st century.

In sum, there seems to have been no linear path in the evolution of the North Korean political prison camp system. It appears to have been, at once, a counteraction to de-Stalinization, a doubling down on Stalinist practices to maintain tight control, and a distancing from Stalin and Soviet practices via a gravitation to Maoist policies and influences. But whether it was a pragmatic, and clandestine, work of bureaucracy that absorbed decades of persecution, or more the work of a singular evil actor, remains unclear.

Population
In 2013, there were between 80,000 and 120,000 political prisoners in kwalliso. The number is down from 150,000–200,000 during the 1990s and early 2000s, due to releases, deaths, and also the near-abandonment of the family responsibility principle, where immediate family members of a convicted political criminal were also regarded as political criminals and imprisoned. The earliest estimates were from 1982, when the number was thought to be 105,000.

Camp locations

North Korea's kwalliso consist of a series of sprawling encampments measuring kilometers long and kilometers wide. The number of these encampments has varied over time. They are located mostly in the valleys between high mountains in the northern provinces of North Korea. There are between 5,000 and 50,000 prisoners per kwalliso.

The kwalliso are usually surrounded at their outer perimeters by barbed-wire fences punctuated with guard towers and patrolled by heavily armed guards. The encampments include self-contained, closed "village" compounds for single persons, usually the alleged wrongdoers, and other closed, fenced-in "villages" for the extended families of the wrongdoers.

The following lists the operating kwalliso camps:
 Prison camp No. 14: Kaech'ŏn, South Pyongan province 
 Prison camp No. 16: Myonggan, North Hamgyong province.
 Prison camp No. 18:  Pukch'ang, South Pyongan province.
 Prison camp No. 25: Ch'ŏngjin, North Hamgyong province.

Camp closures
Notable kwalliso closures are listed below:
 In 1989, Camp No. 11 in Kyŏngsŏng County, North Hamgyong Province was closed to convert the area into a villa for Kim Il-sung. Approximately 20,000 family prisoners were transferred to other political penal labor camps.
 Prison camp No. 12 in Onsŏng County, North Hamgyong Province was also closed in 1989 because the camp was deemed too close to the Chinese border. The prisoners were transferred to Camp No. 22.
 At the end of 1990, Camp No. 13 in Chongsŏng, also Onsŏng County, was closed. Approximately 20,000 prisoners were relocated after fears that the camp was located too close to the Chinese border.
 Camp No. 15 in Yodok County, South Hamgyong Province was closed in 2014 to create a model prison as part of a campaign to whitewash North Korea's human rights record.
 Camp No. 17 in Toksong County, South Hamgyong Province was closed in 1984, and approximately 30,000-40,000 prisoners were relocated to help develop a mine in Camp No. 18.
 Camp No. 19 in Tanchon, South Hamgyong Province was closed in 1990 to decrease the amount of political prison camps.
 Prison camp No. 22 in Hoeryong, North Hamgyong Province was closed in 2012 and approximately 3,000 remaining prisoners were relocated to Camp No. 16. The camp was closed after the warden running it and an officer defected.
 Camp No. 23 in Toksong, South Hamgyong Province was shut down in 1987 with all prisoners being released.
 Camp No. 24 in Tongsin, Chagang Province was closed in 1990.
 Camp No. 26 in Sŭngho's Hwachŏn-dong was closed in January 1991.
 Camp No. 27 at Ch'ŏnma, North Pyongan Province was closed in 1990 for unknown reasons.

Legislative structure
The kwalliso are run by the State Security Department, North Korea's secret police agency and are therefore not specifically tied to the laws and courts of North Korea. However, each camp is expected to operate in strict accordance with state Juche ideology.

Operating principles
Detainees are regularly told that they are traitors to the nation who have betrayed their Leader and thus deserve execution, but whom the Workers' Party has decided, in its mercy, not to kill, but to keep alive in order to repay the nation for their treachery, through forced labor for the rest of their lives.
The emphasis of these camps is very much placed upon collective responsibility where individuals ultimately take responsibility for their own class's "wrongdoing". Kwalliso guards emphasize this point by reportedly carving excerpts from Kim Il-sung's speeches into wood signs and door entrances. 
Work teams are given stringent work quotas, and the failure to meet them means even further reduced food rations.

Working conditions
Below-subsistence level food rations coupled with hard, forced labor results in a high level of deaths in detention not only as a result of working to death but also by rife disease caused by poor hygiene conditions. Corn rations are the usual staple diet of any prisoner but these may be supplemented by other foods found during labor such as weeds and animals. Each five-person work group has an informant, as does every prison camp "village". Survivors and commentators have compared the conditions of these camps to those operated in Central and Eastern Europe by Nazi Germany during World War II in the Holocaust calling the DPRK's network of political prison camps the North Korean Holocaust. There have also been comparisons between the North Korean network of political prison camps to the penal labor colonies of the USSR under Joseph Stalin, with many Western media outlets describing "Kwalliso" as "North Korea's Gulag".

Internment of prisoners
Defector statements suggest prisoners come to the camps in two ways:
 Individuals are likely taken and escorted by the State Security Department, detained in small cells and subjected to intense and prolonged interrogation, involving beatings and severe torture, after which they are dispatched to one of the prison labor camps.
 Family members: The primary suspect in the family is firstly escorted to the prison camp, and the Bowibu officers later escort family members from their home to the encampment. Family members are usually allowed to bring their own goods with them into the camp; however, these are usually only used by prisoners as bribing commodities later on.

Encampment outlay
Guard towers and barbed wire fences usually demark camp boundaries apart from where terrain is impassable.
Prisoners are housed within scattered villages usually at the  base of valleys and mountains. Single inhabitants are sub grouped accordingly into an assigned communal cafeterias and dormitories and families are usually placed into shack rooms and are required to feed themselves.

Zoning of prison camps
Areas of the encampments are zoned or designated accordingly for individuals or families of the wrong-doers or wrong-thinkers. Both individuals and families are further sub divided accordingly into either a "revolutionary processing zone" or "total control zone":
 The "revolutionary processing zone" accommodates prisoners having the opportunity of future release from the camp back into society. Thus these prisoners are likely ideologically re-educated  in so called "revolutionizing" areas of the camp – tasks include forced memorization of speeches by Kim Il-sung and Kim Jong-il with specific emphasis placed on re-education of children. A revolutionary processing zone is thought to be operating in Pukch'ang concentration camp and also at Yodŏk concentration camp in South Hamgyong Province.
 There is no reported re-education of prisoners in "total control zones" presumably because these prisoners are not seen fit to be released and are deemed counter-revolutionary.

Awareness
According to North Korean defectors, ordinary North Korean citizens are aware that the camps exist, if not the exact locations. Political prisoners are referred to as the "people who are sent to the mountains".

Demand for closure 
Amnesty International summarizes the human rights situation North Korea's kwalliso camps: "Men, women and children in the camp face forced hard labor, inadequate food, beatings, totally inadequate medical care and unhygienic living conditions. Many fall ill while in prison, and a large number die in custody or soon after release." The organization demands the immediate closure of all other political prison camps in North Korea. The demand is supported by the International Coalition to Stop Crimes against Humanity in North Korea, a coalition of over 40 human rights organizations.

See also

 Human rights in North Korea
 Prisons in North Korea
 Forced labor in the Soviet Union
 Gulag
 Laogai

References

Further reading

External links 
Report of the Commission of Inquiry on Human Rights in the Democratic People's Republic of Korea—detailed report, resources include maps and satellite photographs of camps
Amnesty International: North Korea: Political Prison Camps - Document on conditions in North Korean prison camps
 – Comprehensive analysis of various aspects of life in political prison camps
Freedom House: Concentrations of inhumanity  – Analysis of the phenomena of repression associated with North Korea's political labor camps
Christian Solidarity Worldwide: North Korea: A case to answer – a call to act – Report to emphasize the urgent need to respond to mass killings, arbitrary imprisonment, torture and related international crimes
 Washington Post: North Koreas Hard Labor Camps - Explore North Korean prison camps with interactive map
 

 
Penal labour
Penal system in North Korea